Alberte Pullman (née Bucher)  (26 August 1920  – 7 January 2011) was a French theoretical and quantum chemist. She studied at the Sorbonne starting in 1938. During her studies she worked on calculations at Centre National de la Recherche Scientifique (CNRS). From 1943 she worked with Raymond Daudel. She completed her doctorate in 1946. On his return from war service in 1946, she married Bernard Pullman. She and her husband worked together until his death in 1996. Together they wrote several books including Quantum Biochemistry, Interscience Publishers, 1963. Their work in the 1950s and 1960s was the beginning of the new field of Quantum Biochemistry. They pioneered the application of quantum chemistry to predicting the carcinogenic properties of aromatic hydrocarbons.

Pullman was born in Nantes, France. She was a member of the International Academy of Quantum Molecular Science and a member and former President of  The International Society of Quantum Biology and Pharmacology.

References

External links
An interview with Mme Prof. Dr. Alberte Pullman

1920 births
20th-century French chemists
2011 deaths
University of Paris alumni
Members of the International Academy of Quantum Molecular Science
Theoretical chemists
Scientists from Nantes